Mirka Francia Vasconcelos (born 14 February 1975, in Villa Clara) is a Cuban-Italian volleyball player who has won two Olympic gold medals with the Cuba women's national volleyball team. At 1.84 meters (6 ft) tall, she played as a blocker before becoming a hitter in 2004.

Life and career 
Born in Santa Clara, Cuba, Francia first played volleyball at age ten and joined the junior national team in Havana four years later. With the national team she won two gold medals, at the 1996 Summer Olympics in Atlanta and at the 2000 Summer Olympics in Sydney. She also played on the Cuban national team that won the FIVB Volleyball Women's World Championship in 1994 and 1998.

In the 1998-1999 season she played for Romanelli Firenze in the Italian second division before joining Sirio Perugia for the following season. She skipped the 2000-2001 season because of pregnancy, but rejoined Sirio Perugia the next year. With the team she has won the Italian Championship three times (2002–2003, 2004–2005, 2006–2007) and the Italian Cup two times (2003, 2005), also winning the Women's CEV Champions League in 2006 and 2008 also being awarded "Best Spiker", and the 2007 CEV Cup when she was awarded "Best Scorer". She acquired Italian citizenship in 2004, but has declined to play for the Italy women's national volleyball team due to family matters.

For season 2008/2009 she started playing for the Turkish team Eczacibasi Istanbul. With this team she won the "Best Scorer" title for the Champions League regular season 2009 and the Best Spiker, Best Server and Top Scorer of the 2009 Turkish Championship.

Francia was inducted in the Volleyball Hall of Fame in 2019.

Clubs
 Romanelli Firenze (1998–1999)
 Sirio Perugia (1999–2008)
 Eczacibasi Zentiva Istanbul (2008–2012)
  Top Quality Group San Giustino (2014–   )

Awards

Individuals
 1999 FIVB World Cup "Best Blocker"
 2008 Champions League Final Four "Best Spiker"
 2009 Champions League Regular Season "Best Scorer"
 2009 Turkish Championship "Top Scorer"
 2009 Turkish Championship "Best Spiker"
 2009 Turkish Championship "Best Server"

Clubs
 2000 Copa Coppe - Champion, with Despar Perugia
 2003 Italian Cup - Champion, with Despar Perugia
 2003 Italian Championship - Champion, with Despar Perugia
 2005 Italian Cup - Champion, with Sirio Perugia
 2005 CEV Cup - Champion, with Sirio Perugia
 2005 Italian Championship - Champion, with Sirio Perugia
 2005–06 CEV Indesit Champions League - Champion, with Sirio Perugia
 2006 Coppa di Lega - Champion, with Sirio Perugia
 2007 Italian Cup - Champion, with Sirio Perugia
 2007 CEV Cup - Champion, with Sirio Perugia
 2007 Italian Championship - Champion, with Sirio Perugia
 2007 Italian Super Cup - Champion, with Sirio Perugia
 2007–08 CEV Indesit Champions League - Champion, with Colussi Perugia
 2009 Turkish Championship - Runner-Up, with Eczacibasi Zentiva Istanbul
 2011 Turkish Cup - Champion, with Eczacıbaşı VitrA

References

External links
 September edition of monthly magazine Pallavolo Supervolley
 Italian League Profile
 Despar Sirio Profile of Mirka Francia

1975 births
Living people
Cuban women's volleyball players
People from Santa Clara, Cuba
Italian women's volleyball players
Cuban emigrants to Italy
Naturalised citizens of Italy
Olympic gold medalists for Cuba
Olympic volleyball players of Cuba
Volleyball players at the 1996 Summer Olympics
Volleyball players at the 2000 Summer Olympics
Eczacıbaşı volleyball players
Olympic medalists in volleyball
Medalists at the 2000 Summer Olympics
Medalists at the 1996 Summer Olympics
Pan American Games gold medalists for Cuba
Pan American Games bronze medalists for Cuba
Pan American Games medalists in volleyball
Wing spikers
Volleyball players at the 1991 Pan American Games
Volleyball players at the 1995 Pan American Games
Volleyball players at the 1999 Pan American Games
Medalists at the 1991 Pan American Games
Medalists at the 1995 Pan American Games
Medalists at the 1999 Pan American Games